The National Unity Bridge (Puente de la Unidad Nacional) is a bridge complex in northeastern Guayaquil, Ecuador with a length of . The National Unity Bridge crosses the Daule River and Babahoyo River, which combine to form the Guayas River immediately downstream. The bridge connects the city of Guayaquil with Durán to its east, and by extension to the highland part of Ecuador. Construction of the National Unity Bridge commenced on 23 March 1967, and the bridge was inaugurated on 9 October 1970.

References

Bridges in Ecuador
Buildings and structures in Guayaquil
Bridges completed in 1970